Prestonia is a genus of plants in the family Apocynaceae, first described as a genus in 1810. It is native to Mexico, Central America, South America, and the West Indies. It is closely related to  Artia and Parsonsia.

Species

Formerly included
 Prestonia agglutinata (Jacq.) Woodson = Echites agglutinatus Jacq.
 Prestonia arborescens Monach. = Hylaea arborescens (Monach.) J.F.Morales
 Prestonia caudata Woodson = Echites puntarenensis J.F.Morales
 Prestonia contorta (M.Martens & Galeotti) Hemsl. = Laubertia contorta (M.Martens & Galeotti) Woodson 
 Prestonia hirsuta Spreng. 1824 not Müll.Arg. 1860 = Mandevilla pavonii (A.DC.) Woodson
 Prestonia langlassei Standl. = Laubertia contorta (M.Martens & Galeotti) Woodson 
 Prestonia leptoloba Monach. = Hylaea leptoloba (Monach.) J.F.Morales
 Prestonia peruviana Spreng. = Mandevilla glandulosa (Ruiz & Pav.) Woodson
 Prestonia woodsoniana (Monach.) A.H.Gentry = Echites woodsonianus Monach.

References

 
Apocynaceae genera